Walter P. Miller (July 30, 1915 – January 21, 2001) was an American professional basketball player. He played in both the National Basketball League and Basketball Association of America after a collegiate career at Duquesne University.

BAA career statistics

Regular season

References

1915 births
2001 deaths
All-American college men's basketball players
American men's basketball players
United States Navy personnel of World War II
Basketball players from Pennsylvania
Duquesne Dukes football players
Duquesne Dukes men's basketball players
Forwards (basketball)
People from Homestead, Pennsylvania
Pittsburgh Ironmen players
Pittsburgh Pirates (NBL) players
Sportspeople from the Pittsburgh metropolitan area
Youngstown Bears players